Teresa, officially the Municipality of Teresa,  is a 2nd class municipality in the province of Rizal, Philippines. According to the 2020 census, it has a population of 64,072 people.

It is situated in the slopes of the Sierra Madre Mountains and is landlocked on four corners by Antipolo on the north, Angono on the west, Tanay, on the east, and Morong, on the south.

Most of the people here are Tagalogs. Teresa is primarily known for the nearby mountain resorts, Villa Sampaguita Resort and Real Cove Resort (Formerly Sunrise Resort, Sunset Resort, and Terra Villa Resort). Contrary to some articles, Teresa is actually a valley surrounded by mountains. The town center is located almost at the center of the valley. In an aerial view of Teresa, one would notice the previously vast expanse of agricultural land bordered by marble-rich mountains.

The town is passed by motorists bounded for the more inland towns of Morong, Baras, Tanay, Pililla, and Laguna and Quezon provinces.

Land uses (in hectares): Commercial (1.92), Residential (104.32), Agricultural (1183.35), Protected areas (13,952.41), Industrial / Ecozone (710.69), Institutional (112.28), and Special / Other uses (123.03).

The town's festivals are the Turumba sa Mahal na Patron Santa Rosa (held every August 23), Anniversary celebration of town independence (every December 30), and Town fiesta (every 1st Sunday of March).

History
Teresa was first named "Oroquieta" and was a barrio of the Municipality of Morong. As a non-independent town its name was changed to "Santa Rosa" in honor of the town's patron saint, St. Rose of Lima. Against the will of its people, Santa Rosa was annexed to Antipolo, which led to animosity between the two towns. Most of the residents preferred to be under jurisdiction of Morong.

Unstable conditions led militant leaders such as Messra. San Esteban, Santo Domingo, Pio Piriquiquit Santos, Raymundo Francisco, Mariano Celo Francisco, Diego P. Cruz, Santiago P. Cruz, Sabino de Ramos, Platon Gonzales, Brigido Capli Cruz,Lorenzo Capli Cruz, Saturnino Francisco, and Francisco Natividad to clamor for independence. In 1877, the Spanish lawyer Don Mariano Rodriguez Candelaria assisted the people in appealing to the Spanish Governor-General for separate ownership. The appeal was given preferential attention, and Santa Rosa was later declared an independent town. In 1900, the people agreed to change the name from Santa Rosa to "Teresa" in honor of the Spanish lawyer's mother, Doña Teresa Candelaria.

In 1903, when rebellion broke out, Teresa was again annexed to the Municipality of Antipolo. In 1917, the able men of the town again moved for independence with the help of the Rizal Governor Eulogio Rodriguez, Sr. This move, however, failed due to political reasons.

With the help extended by Senator Rafael Palma, the independence of Teresa was approved and declared by the Governor-General Charles E. Yeater on January 1, 1919, through Executive Order No. 57 (signed December 16, 1918). Roberto de Jesus was appointed as the first "Municipal President" (known as Mayor today). Functioning as a town, Teresa comprised three barrios at the time: May-Iba, Pantay, and San Roque.

After three years of independence, the town acquired a municipal building on November 8, 1921, which was called Presedencia. Paulino de la Rosa was the second Municipal President of Teresa, Rizal. During his term the elementary school building (located in Dalig) was inaugurated. His portrait hangs proudly as the first in the grand entrance of the municipal building in Teresa, Rizal.

Geography

Barangays

Teresa is politically subdivided into 9 barangays.
 Bagumbayan
 Dalig
 Dulumbayan
 May-Iba
 Poblacion
 Prinza 
 San Gabriel
 San Roque
 Calumpang Santo Cristo

As of the year 2010, there was a proposal to name the eastern section of the municipality as a 10th barangay (the area from the Marcos Highway towards General Nakar in Quezon Province). However, the area is part of the disputed political claim among the municipalities of Morong, Teresa, Baras, and Tanay.

Climate

Demographics

Major religious denominations: Roman Catholic (75%), Iglesia Ni Cristo (12%), Protestant (2%), Islam (1%), and Others (10%)

Economy

Formerly, the predominant source of livelihood in Teresa is agriculture. But with the opening of the Republic Cement Factory (Formerly FR Cement Factory), Teresa Marble Corporation, and ABC Chemical Factory, members of the community have slowly shifted to industry. More, the real estate boom in the 90s caused a surge in the population in Teresa with the opening of the Carissa Homes East 1 (CHE-1 in Bagumbayan) & 2 (CHE-2 in San Gabriel and Dalig) subdivisions and the La Hacienda, La Montagna and Palazzo Estates located at the highlands of Barangay Bagumbayan.

Annual income is P 85,548,638.56 from manufacturing (cement, marble, limestone quarrying), agro-industrial (piggery and poultry farms), and operation of economic enterprises (public market, slaughter house, sukol spring resort, MRF).

Infrastructure
Basic facilities include 2 hospitals, 10 clinics, and 1 public market.

Power is supplied by the Manila Electric Company. Water supply is through the municipal Teresa Water District (TERWD) and Buhay Na Tubig Multi-Purpose Cooperative.

Educational institutions consist of 1 university and college, 8 high schools, and 12 elementary schools.

References

External links

Teresa Profile at PhilAtlas.com
[ Philippine Standard Geographic Code]
Philippine Census Information
Local Governance Performance Management System

Municipalities of Rizal